is a passenger railway station located in the Hinase neighborhood of city of Bizen, Okayama Prefecture, Japan, operated by the West Japan Railway Company (JR West).

Lines

Station layout
The station consists of one side platform and one island platform located on an embankment, and connected to the station building by a footbridge. The outbound main line is Platform 1, inbound main line is Platform 2. Platform 3 is the secondary main line for both upper and lower trains.. The station is unattended.

Platforms

Adjacent stations

History
Hinase Station was opened on 1 March 1955. With the privatization of Japanese National Railways (JNR) on 1 April 1987, the station came under the control of JR West.

Passenger statistics
In fiscal 2019, the station was used by an average of 315 passengers daily

Surrounding area
Hinase Port
Kagoura History and Culture Museum

See also
List of railway stations in Japan

References

External links

 JR West Station Official Site

Railway stations in Okayama Prefecture
Akō Line
Railway stations in Japan opened in 1955
Bizen, Okayama